is a 1952 black-and-white Japanese film directed by Kōzō Saeki.

Overview 
Chiemi Eri sings in the film.

Cast 
 Chiemi Eri
 Jun Negami
 Kazuko Fushimi
 Jōji Oka
 Minoru Chiaki
 Ayako Wakao

See also
 List of films in the public domain in the United States

References

External links 
 

Japanese black-and-white films
1952 films
Films directed by Kozo Saeki
Daiei Film films
Japanese drama films
1952 drama films
1950s Japanese films